Britt Swartley (born August 3, 1971) is an American freestyle skier. He competed in the men's aerials event at the 1998 Winter Olympics.

References

External links
 

1971 births
Living people
American male freestyle skiers
Olympic freestyle skiers of the United States
Freestyle skiers at the 1998 Winter Olympics
People from Lansdale, Pennsylvania
Sportspeople from Pennsylvania